Rogožarski was a Yugoslav aircraft manufacturer.

History 
Officially established on 22 April 1924 under the name of Prva Srpska Fabrika Aeroplana Živojin Rogožarski, the factory was responsible along with Ikarus for most of Yugoslavia's air industry between the world wars. Initially, the factory repaired aircraft confiscated in the First World War, and soon started to manufacture local aircraft, and licensed manufacture as well.  Nationalised in 1946, the factory was merged along with Zmaj into Ikarus which continued in the aeronautical industry until 1962.  The factory Rogožarski has made a total of 286 aircraft.

Aircraft

See also
 Aircraft industry of Serbia

References

Footnotes

Notes

 
Aircraft manufacturers of Yugoslavia
Aircraft manufacturers of Serbia
Manufacturing companies based in Belgrade
Serbian brands
1923 establishments in Serbia
1946 disestablishments in Yugoslavia
Manufacturing companies established in 1923
Manufacturing companies disestablished in 1946